Germinal may refer to:

Germinal (French Republican Calendar), the seventh month of the calendar, approximately March 21 - April 19

Émile Zola
Germinal (novel), an 1885 novel by Émile Zola
Germinal (1913 film), a French silent film based on the Zola novel directed by Albert Capellani
Germinal (1963 film), a French film based on the Zola novel directed by Yves Allégret
Germinal (1993 film), a French film based on the Zola novel directed by Claude Berri

Medicine 
 Germinal epithelium (disambiguation), either:
 Germinal epithelium (male), a layer of cells covering the testicle
 Germinal epithelium (female), a layer of cells covering the ovary
 Germinal epithelium or germ layer, a layer of cells formed during animal embryogenesis
 Germinal center, area of lymph tissue rich with B cells

Other uses
Germinal (journal), a Jewish anarchist journal from London
Germinal (F735), a ship of the French Marine Nationale
K.F.C. Germinal Beerschot, a Belgian football club
Club Atlético Germinal, an Argentine football club